The second Legislative Assembly elections were held in Uttar Pradesh in 1957. The Indian National Congress won a comfortable margin with 286 of the 430 Vidhan Sabha seats, although it was less of a majority than in the previous election in 1951.

The Elections to the Uttar Pradesh Legislative Assembly were held on 25 February 1957. 1711 candidates contested for the 430 constituencies in the Assembly. There were 89 two-member constituencies and 252 single-member constituencies.

Important members
Sampurnanand was the second Chief Minister of Uttar Pradesh. He succeeded Govind Ballabh Pant of his party and served as a Chief Minister from 1954 to 1960. In 1960, due to a political crisis initiated by Kamlapati Tripathi and Chandra Bhanu Gupta, Sampurnanand was  asked to quit the post of Chief Minister and was sent to Rajasthan as the Governor. Following were the important members of the Second Legislative Assembly of Uttar Pradesh.

Results

|- style="background-color:#E9E9E9; text-align:center;"
! class="unsortable" |
! Political party !! Flag !! Seats  Contested !! Won !! Net change  in seats !! % of  Seats
! Votes !! Vote % !! Change in vote %
|- style="background: #90EE90;"
| 
| style="text-align:left;" |Indian National Congress
| 
| 430 || 286 ||  102 || 66.51 || 92,98,382 || 42.42 ||  5.51
|-
| 
| style="text-align:left;" |Praja Socialist Party
|
| 262 || 44 || New || 10.23 || 31,70,865 || 14.47 || New
|-
| 
| style="text-align:left;" |Bharatiya Jana Sangh
|
| 243 || 17 ||  15 || 3.95 || 21,57,881 || 9.84 ||  3.39
|-
| 
| style="text-align:left;" |Communist Party of India
| 
| 91 || 9 ||  9 || 2.09 || 8,40,348 || 3.83 ||  2.90
|-
| 
|
| 399 || 74 ||  59 || 17.21 || 62,85,457 || 28.68 || N/A
|- class="unsortable" style="background-color:#E9E9E9"
! colspan = 3|
! style="text-align:center;" |Total seats !! 430 ( 0) !! style="text-align:center;" |Voters !! 4,89,53,427 !! style="text-align:center;" |Turnout !! colspan = 2|2,19,18,604 (44.77%)
|}

Elected members

See also

 1957 elections in India

References

1957
Uttar